BBQ Champ is a British reality television series that first aired on 31 July 2015 and ended on 28 August 2015 on ITV. The show was presented by Myleene Klass and starred judges Mark Blatchford and Adam Richman.

Premise
The aim of the programme was to find the best amateur barbecuer, with the help of the judges. The winner received a prize of £25,000. At the end of each episode, two contestants who had least impressed the judges enough had to face each other in a grill–off. The judges' favourite contestant in the grill–off advanced to the next episode, whilst the other was eliminated from the competition.

Contestants

Ratings
Official episode viewing figures are from BARB.

Reception
Sam Wollaston writing for The Guardian described it as "Basically the Great British BBQ-Off, with Klass playing the Mel & Sue role (fewer puns, posher frocks), Richman and Blathford as Paul Hollywood and Mary Berry, and the setting outdoors. In the meantime, Great British Bake Off starts next week. I don’t think it has much to worry about from this." Ben Travis for the Evening Standard made similar comments: "The show might as well be called The Great British BBQ-Off for all that it poaches from the BBC’s winning culinary formula. There’s a reason that formula works though, and while BBQ Champ isn’t as unexpectedly gripping as the Beeb’s quaint baking contest, the first episode proves enjoyable viewing."

In September 2015 ITV stated they had no future plans for a second series, after the programmes failed to come close to matching the viewing figures of the rival BBC programme, among the negative reviews received from the critics.

References

External links

2010s British reality television series
2015 British television series debuts
2015 British television series endings
British cooking television shows
ITV reality television shows
English-language television shows